This is the list of characters in the Yu-Gi-Oh! GX animated series. The official English anime and the English manga by VIZ Media have changed character names.

Main characters

The main protagonist of the series. He is described as an energetic, passionate and optimistic boy who comes to Duel Academy to learn to become the new King of Games. He is shown to be a very talented duelist as he is seen beating out some of the toughest duelists such as Professor Crowler, Chazz Princeton/Jun Manjoume, and various others. Despite his excellence in dueling, he is placed in the Slifer Red dorm due to his below average grades and overall disinterest in anything that is not duel-related.
In the first season, Jaden's excellence in dueling lead him to become one of the Spirit Key holders, a responsibility given to the best duelists in the school, who are meant to guard the Spirit Keys from the Shadow Riders who wish to resurrect the Sacred Beasts. In the second season, Jaden fights against the Society of Light, a cult like organization that wishes to brainwash the world. It also is revealed that Jaden possesses an ability called the Gentle Darkness, a power that was created to balance out the light. The Gentle Darkness also gives Jaden special powers such as the ability to communicate with Duel Spirits, most often conversing with Winged Kuriboh, a card he received from Yugi Mutou on the day of his entrance exam. In the third season, Jaden and his friends are transported to an alternate dimension where duel monsters are real. While in an alternate dimension, Jaden falls into despair after seeing his friends sacrificed and becomes possessed by the Supreme King, a ruthless and merciless ruler and the original wielder of the Gentle Darkness. After being released from his possession, Jaden learns that he is the reincarnation of the Supreme King and that Yubel, a duel Monster that was the Supreme King's guardian and the mastermind behind the alternate dimension, is bounded to the Supreme King by prophecy. In order to fulfill the prophecy and cleanse Yubel of her corruption caused by the light, Jaden decides to fuse himself with Yubel. Afterwards, he has gained the powers of both the Supreme King and Yubel with the ability to make duel monsters come alive, see visions of the future, resist supernatural powers (such as hypnosis) and the ability to generate wind. He is described as someone who is "not human." After his time in the alternate dimension and his fusion with Yubel, Jaden's original happy and easy going personality turns serious and aloof. He no longer finds dueling fun and wishes to only duel when he needs to. He bares a great amount of guilt for all the misfortunes his friends and others had to go through and finds himself trying to distance himself from others. In the fourth season, Jaden battles against "Nightshroud" who preys on everybody's negative emotions and wishes to engulf humanity into his Darkness Realm. His serious personality eventually begins to revert to his old personality with the help of his friends and Yugi Mutou whom he got to duel.
He specializes in using Fusion Monsters, his main deck being the Elemental Heroes, monsters based on comic superheroes with his signature being "Elemental Hero Flame Wingman." Jaden later switches decks to a "Neo-Spacian", monsters based on alien creatures drawn by Jaden when he was younger. The Neo- Spacians use contact fusion to fuse "Elemental Hero Neos", his new signature card, to create a new Fusion monster. He later combines the two decks together.

Jaden's roommate and friend at Duel Academy. He often doubts himself, living in the shadow of his older brother Zane, but has shown himself to be a talented duelist, managing to rise in the ranks from Slifer Red to Ra Yellow to Obelisk Blue. He battles using a Vehicroid deck which consists of monsters related to different machinery or vehicles. His deck also possesses "Power Bond" a powerful card that was given to him by Zane that he initially was scared of.

A portly student who is described as large and intimidating, like a bear, but is lazy and "has the energy of a sloth". He had to repeat his freshman year, but becomes more confident after being encouraged by Jaden. He is associated with Silfer Red. He later leaves Duel Academy in order to work at Industrial Illusions as a card designer.

A duelist associated with Ra Yellow and is regarded as a dueling genius, having the top grades of his freshman applicant class. His strength is in studying and preparing for different situations, relying on rational methods. He possesses six carefully calculated decks for each Monster attribute; he claims that a single carelessly added card can throw off their balance. He is good friends with Jaden despite their very different personalities and is seen to view Jaden as a worthy rival. Bastion's decks are all based around a single attribute and usually contain monsters, spells, and traps related to Science or Math such as "Water Dragon" or "Magnet Warrior"

A freshman duelist who ranks in the Obelisk Blue and one of Jaden's rivals. He is elitist, thinking that low-scoring duelists such as Jaden should be kicked out.  It is revealed early in the first season of the series that his elitism stems from his older brothers who urge him to become a great duelist in order to have their family reign over the dueling world, as his brothers rule over the political and financial worlds. After becoming estranged with his brothers, Chazz decides to pursue a career in dueling, without their help. Initially hating Jaden, he comes to respect and befriend Jaden as he sees that Jaden as his rival. It is also shown that he has a very large crush on Alexis (Asuka). He initially uses a power based deck, focusing on powerful monsters such as the Armed Dragons. Later on, he becomes able to see duel spirits and starts using the Ojama Trio, a trio of brothers with zero attack points but several uses. His self-imposed nickname in the English version is "The Chazz" while his Japanese nickname is "Manjoume Thunder," which is spawned from the phrase . Chazz's deck has changed the most out of everyone. He initially played with a  "Chthonian" deck which consisted of dark fiends. This was changed to the "VWXYZ" deck and later an "Armed Dragon" deck. Chazz then forms a bond with the "Ojame Trio" and changes his deck to be Ojama based. He later combines all the decks together to make his final and permanent deck. 

A beautiful and talented duelist who is regarded as the queen of the Obelisk Blue. She is not elitist like many of the other Blue members, and quickly takes interest in Jaden.  She does not follow the crowd nor does she regard herself as better than other people like some students in the dormitory, but has a stern pride as an Obelisk Blue duelist. Alexis is shown to be very good friends with Zane Trusdale as he was very close friends with her brother Atticus until he went missing one day. After constantly searching for clues surrounding his disappearance, until it is revealed that he joined the Shadow Riders, under the control of Nightshroud. She is shown to be headstrong and independent as well as a good friend of Jaden. It is later revealed she has a large crush on Jaden which is unknown if he reciprocates and is aware of Chazz's crush on her. Alexis plays a "Cyber Girl" deck which consisted of cards related to sports such as "Etoile Cyber" and "Cyber Blader." She later adds in Cyber Angel cards, ritual-based monsters based on the spirits and gods of Asian mythology.

A third-year Obelisk Blue student and the king of Duel Academy, nicknamed "Kaiser" in the Japanese version. He is the older brother of Syrus. He is the top duelist at the school and has reportedly never lost to someone on purpose. He serves as one of Jaden's friendly rivals in the first season and is only student who has actually beaten Jaden in a duel. He is also good friends with Alexis and Atticus and was helping Alexis look for any clues to where Atticus disappeared to. Since he is the top duelist, he was given the honor of choosing his partner in the graduation duel. He chooses Jaden and passes the title of top duelist to Jaden before leaving Duel Academy and joining the Pro-Dueling League. Originally a star in the Pro-Dueling League, he loses a duel against Aster Phoenix and slowly loses his winning streak and reputation. Looking for a chance to redeem himself, he begins dueling underground which use shock collars and develops a more aggressive and violent personality earning him the name "Hell Kaiser" in the Japanese version. When in an alternate dimension, Zane teams up with Aster to stop Yubel, but in his final battle, his heart gives out, due to the shock collars used in underground duels. His final wish is to let the Cyber End Dragon be his symbol and for Jaden to overcome his darkness. He is later revealed to have survived his heart failure, but is in a very weakened state. He uses a Cyber Dragon deck which consist primarily of different Cyber Dragons with his signature being "Cyber End Dragon." He later acquires the Cyberdark deck to reflect his new personality with his signature being "Cyberdark Dragon." He later combines these two decks with Cyber End Dragon becoming his signature once again.

First appearing in "The Maiden in Love", Blair Flannigan is a young girl who enroll into Duel Academy disguised as a boy in hopes of getting close to Zane Truesdale, her crush. After being caught by Jaden while sneaking into Zane's dorm room, he defeats her in a duel and confesses her love to Zane but is politely rejected due to her being in fifth grade. Afterwards, she leaves Duel Academy and turns her affections to Jaden, promising to return to Duel Academy and enroll when she is older. In "The Hands of Justice (Part 2)", she returns to Duel Academy in the midst of the GX Tournament to duel Zane but is again rejected and is given his GX medal. Dueling Chazz in the final match, she is defeated but is accepted into Duel Academy after proving her worth as a duelist. Blair uses a deck of girls to sway her opponent's male monsters in the first season and later uses a deck of "Egg" monsters when she is reintroduced in the third season where she enters Duel Academy now that she is old enough.

A duelist who enrolls in Jaden's school during the second season and is grouped with Ra Yellow. He has a muscular physique and plays a Dinosaur deck. When he was younger, he had an accident where scientists implanted a dinosaur bone in his leg. Hassleberry uses a Dinosaur Evolution deck.

Recurring characters

A new student hailing from East Academy and enters Duel Academy in the third year. He carries a digi-recorder and is often seen taking notes on it. For most of his life, he has always put the needs of others ahead of himself. He was adopted by the Gecko family and was supposed to be the future heir until his brother was born. Since then, he has devoted his time to help him despite the less attention he's gotten and being looked down upon. Adrian gets sent to another dimension by Yubel and tries to become king. He first duels using a cloud type deck then obtains the full power of Exodia by sacrificing his childhood friend Echo and defeats Aster Phoenix in season 3. After losing a duel to Jesse possessed by Yubel, he gets sent to the stars and does not come back. Only after the duel when Echo disappears completely does he mourn her loss. He and Echo are the only ones that permanently died in the other dimension.

A talented professional duelist who enters Duel Academy as a freshman during the second season. When he was young, his father was mysteriously killed (kidnapped in the dub) and he was taken in by Sartorius, being used as a pawn in his plans. Similar to Jaden's Elemental Hero deck, Aster uses a Destiny Hero deck, symbolizing his desire for vengeance.

His given name means "blizzard" in Japanese, from which he derives his self-appointed title, "Blizzard Prince" in the original version of the series. His signature is written as "Fubuki 10 Join". Atticus Rhodes is the missing brother of Alexis and his disappearance is a driving force in his sister's determination during the first season of the series.

Initially Professor Viper's right-hand man introduced during the third season. He is described as being tough and having a "no-nonsense style and military upbringing". This is also referenced by his Duel Disk, which is in the shape of a gun that can shoot cards when needed. Axel uses the Volcanic deck. He eventually joins Jaden as one of his allies.

Fonda Fontaine is the supervisor of the female Obelisk Blue dormitory, as well as the school's head medic and gym instructor. During the third year, while trying to protect an injured Blair Flanagan, she is transformed into one of Marcel's Duel Ghouls and duels with Jaden, though she recovers after Duel Academy is returned to its proper place from an alternate dimension. Ms. Fontaine plays an Anti-Cure deck.
 

One of Alexis's boy crazy roommates in the female Obelisk Blue dormitory. She has almost no talent for dueling and would much rather gossip, shop, or fantasize about Alexis's brother Atticus.
 

Vice-Chancellor of Duel Academy beginning with the second season, Bonaparte is a stout man hailing from Paris, France who originally attempted to demolish the Slifer Red dormitory at every opportunity, but was repelled by Dr. Crowler. He later dueled alongside Crowler against Maximillion Pegasus for a job at Industrial Illusions, after they falsely believed themselves to be fired by Chancellor Sheppard. Following Duel Academy's arrival in an alternate dimension, he encourages the students to save his son Marcel from the Duel Spirit Yubel. Previously married, Bonaparte's son is in the custody of his ex-wife. After Marcel is rescued, Bonaparte apologizes for neglecting him and leaving his wife for his career, and the two return to France at the end of the season. Bonaparte plays a Toy Army deck. His character is based on Napoleon I.

A North Academy duelist described as loyal, friendly, and fun-loving. He and Jaden become friends and allies for the series. He uses a Crystal Beast deck and searches for the Rainbow Dragon card, which he eventually acquires in season 3. He activates the card to take the Academy and the rest of the students back to their world, leaving him behind, where he is possessed by Yubel, but rescued by Jaden. In season 4, Jesse helps Jaden defeat Mr. T to save everyone and the world. It is shown that Jesse was at the graduation party at the end.

Introduced in the third season as an Australian duelist originally from South Academy, but now enrolled with Duel Academy. He is described as tough, cunning, but having a carefree attitude. He has a pet crocodile named Shirley (Karen in the Japanese version), who he saved when he was younger. He wears bandages over his right eye, which is revealed to house an Eye of Oricalcum that allows him to see a person's true nature. He uses his power to try to free Jaden from the Supreme King but fails and winds up getting sent to the stars and is later rescued. He duels using a fossil deck and his duel disk resembles a boomerang.

The head of Slifer Red in Duel Academy who, in the Japanese version, often speaks with a 'nyaa' at the end of his sentences. He is later revealed to be an alchemist who used a homunculus body to prolong his life while he joined the Shadow Riders in order to seek out the Three Sacred Beasts. When he is defeated by Jaden, his body dissolves into dust, but his spirit remains with Jaden, offering him advice whenever possible.

One of Alexis's boy crazy roommates in the female Obelisk Blue dormitory. She has almost no talent for dueling and would much rather gossip, shop, or fantasize about Alexis's brother Atticus.
 

A school staff member who works in Duel Academia's card shop, Dorothy actually has very little knowledge of the rules of a Duel. In the English version, she is "Miss Duel Academy." There is an ongoing romance between her and Chancellor Sheppard.
 

The professor heading Ra Yellow, Sartyr has the sad honor of being the least featured of the three main professors of Duel Academy. The other characters do not recognize him immediately, and he is lonely due to most of his students either being promoted to Obelisk Blue or staying with Jaden at Slifer Red. Although the characters do not recognize him, Sartyr points out through a series of flashbacks that he had been a background character in several episodes in the first season as an in-joke about his character not being noticed. Sartyr plays a Spice deck.

The chancellor of Duel Academy, Sheppard watches over the students in his school, but is often directly responsible (though not always fully aware of it) for many of the incidents that befall Jaden and co. In the second season, Sheppard left Duel Academy under the care of Crowler, and was sought by Zane, who wanted to obtain the Underworld deck that lay dormant within his dojo. He eventually resumed his position in time for the GX tournament, part of a plot devised by both himself and Pegasus to lure out the person possessing the famed Ultimate Destiny Card. Sheppard plays a Cyber-Style deck.

A teacher at Duel Academy, and the head of its Obelisk Blue group. He is very strict, believing that weaker students who cannot keep up with his lessons should quit or be expelled. He especially dislikes Jaden, having been defeated by him during the latter's entrance exam. However, his attempts to show up or expel Jaden have only humiliated himself and his followers, while making Jaden look better and better. Crowler eventually appreciates his students and in turn is respected for his noble actions. Crowler plays an Ancient Gear deck.

Antagonists

The Shadow Riders  
The  are composed of seven duelists and their leader of varying origins and backgrounds who each have their own agendas. The Shadow Riders are intent on resurrecting the Three Sacred Beasts (Phantom Demons in the Japanese version).

 

Kagemaru is the leader of the Shadow Riders and the main antagonist of the series' first season as well as the former superintendent of Duel Academy. The "Kage" portion of his name is derived from the Japanese word "kage" (影), meaning "shadow." In horrible health, Kagemaru hoped to attain eternal youth by sacrificing Duel Monster spirits to the Sacred Beasts. During his duel with Jaden, his youth was returned. After being defeated, however, he returned to his aged state. He then asked forgiveness and promised to renounce his former ways, carried off to the hospital by helicopter. Kagemaru plays a Sacred Beast deck.
 

Nightshroud is the first of the Shadow Riders. But in reality, Nightshroud is an entity of unknown origin tied to the darkness itself and the final antagonist in the series. He entered the body of Atticus Rhodes and took control. Being the owner of the other half of the Shadow Charm pendant in Jaden's possession, Nightshroud sets a Shadow Game for both of them where the loser has his soul sealed in a card. When defeated, Nightshrouds' soul (represented by his mask) is sealed away, and Atticus is freed. During the GX Tournament, Atticus uses Nightshrouds' deck in hopes of convincing his friend, Zane Truesdale, that the dark path taken by a duelist is a terrible course. As a result, Nightshrouds' influence (that lay dormant within his cards) is once again able to take control of Atticus, only to be banished following his defeat. In the fourth season, Atticus again uses Nightshrouds' deck to duel Jaden, revealing he still has nightmares about his alter-ego. During the duel, Atticus remembers that one of the missing students at the academy, Yusuke Fujiwara, was the original host of Nightshroud and before he vanished, he made Atticus into a temporary host for Nightshroud to inhabit. But Nightshroud eventually returns in the body of Fujiwara, and though he loses to Atticus in a one-on-one duel, he cheats reversing time and preventing Atticus from activating Inferno Fire Blast. But, after losing to Jaden when he and Jesse double teamed Yusuke, Nightshroud left his vessel and duels Jaden in a match with the world at stake. Jaden reverses all of Nightshrouds' evil doings and finally destroys him. Though beaten, Nightshroud boasts that as long as there is darkness in humans, he would return, but Jaden counters by claiming that as long as there are bonds between humans, Nightshroud has been sealed. In his final duel, Nightshroud is portrayed as a megalomaniac or simply insane, once he claims he is God and the Savior. Nightshroud, while possessing Atticus, plays a Red-Eyes Darkness Dragon deck. Within Yusuke's body, Nightshroud uses a Clear deck. Once without a host, Nightshroud uses his personal Darkness deck.
 

Camula is the second of the Shadow Riders. Her name is derived from the title of Joseph Sheridan le Fanu's novel, Carmilla. A vampire, Camula is very serious when it comes to dueling, as she hopes to revive her race from its destruction by the people of Medieval Times. She had been asleep within her coffin until Kagemaru uncovered it and invited her to join the Shadow Riders. She captures the souls of her opponents following their losses within dolls to fuel her cause, and uses the Shadow Charm strangler around her neck to bet the souls of others in conjunction with the Shadow Game-exclusive Illusion Gate to ensure victory. She manages to obtain the keys of Dr. Crowler and Zane, but during her duel with Jaden, her Shadow Charm's power is negated by the completed item that Jaden possesses. Out of self-confidence, Camula places her own soul on the line, and it is dragged into the gate after she loses, leaving her body empty and turning it to dust. Camula plays a Vampire deck.
 

Amazoness Tania is the third of the Shadow Riders. A white tiger that assumes human form with her Shadow Charm gauntlet to find a worthy duelist to be her husband, Tania travels with another tiger named Bass, who resembles the Amazoness Tiger. She falls in love with Bastion Misawa, and after some sweet talking and showing off her amazing dueling skills, defeats him and makes him her bridegroom for a short time until she grows tired of him. Tania then fights Jaden in a soul match with the effect of Amazoness Arena, and eventually resumes her true form and runs off. She appears before Jaden and his group during the third year as her human self, having been sucked into the second alternate dimension they visit since their last meeting. She serves as their guide through the first town they encounter, and stays behind with Bastion after Jaden liberates it. Tania's Amazoness cards, based on the Amazons of Greek mythology, are divided into two decks: Courage and Knowledge. She uses the Knowledge deck against Bastion, and the Courage deck against Jaden.
 

Don Zaloog is the fourth of the Shadow Riders. Zaloog is actually a Duel Monster spirit brought to life by the power of the Shadow Charm eyepatch he wears. He masquerades as a detective named Detective Zaloog (Police Inspector Manguer in the Japanese version), sent to assist the students in hiding the remaining Spirit Keys, while his posse work on taking the keys incognito. However, since they fail to obtain the keys in a duel, they are unable to unlock the Spirit Gate of the Three Sacred Beasts. When Zaloog and his gang are discovered, he and Chazz Princeton duel with all the remaining keys on the line. In the end, he and his cohorts are defeated, and the power of his Shadow Charm is nullified. After reverting to their spirit forms, the Dark Scorpions join the many weak monsters in Chazz's care, to the young duelist's annoyance. Zaloog plays a Dark Scorpion deck.

Abidos the Third is the fifth of the Shadow Riders. His name is derived from the name of the ancient Egyptian city, Abydos. An ancient pharaoh who never lost a single duel, Abidos regained physical form through the powers of the Shadow Charm headband he wears. With an army of mummies, Abidos gathers Jaden and company on his celestial yacht for a duel. During the duel with Jaden, Abidos realizes that the only reason he kept winning was because his opponents always lost on purpose, simply because he was pharaoh. Jaden, however, manages to give Abidos a real duel in which the opponent actually tries to win. Satisfied with his defeat, Abidos departs for the afterlife, giving Jaden his Shadow Charm, the latter making a promise to meet him again in one-hundred years time, presuming that Jaden will be dead within that time. Abidos plays a Servants of the Pharaoh deck.
 

Titan is the sixth of the Shadow Riders. A hitman originally hired by Crowler to deal with Jaden, Titan captured Alexis Rhodes to force Jaden into a duel for her life. Despite his reputation of possessing the power of a Millennium Item, the "Millennium Item" turned out to be a fake Millennium Puzzle, and Titan used various tricks to mimic a Shadow Game. He became the victim of a real Shadow Game, however, but was saved by Kagemaru, wearing a Shadow Charm mask to bind him to the real world. Taking advantage of Alexis's desire to restore her brother's memories, Titan challenges her in the abandoned dorm where they first met. He is ultimately pulled back into the pits of darkness when he is defeated. Titan plays an Archfiend deck.

Amnael is the seventh and final member of the Shadow Riders. A homunculus inhabited by Banner's soul. Unable to find Banner's cat Pharaoh, Alexis Rhodes, Chazz Princeton, Jaden Yuki and the others start looking for him. While looking, Amnael challenges and defeats both Chazz and Alexis in a duel, who then get sucked into Amnael's book as a result. Jaden gets lead to the abandoned dorm where he defeated Titan. There he finds a mummified body that resembles Banner, and Amnael who later reveals himself to be the spirit of Banner. Amnael and Jaden duel, which results in Jaden's victory. After giving Jaden his Emerald Tablet which previously held his Shadow Charm, Banner is reduced to dust along with his original mummified body. His spirit, however, lives on in the stomach of Pharaoh. His appearance is seen when the cat is clueless causing its body to retrieve Banner's spirit for a short amount of time.

Society of Light
The  is a cult led by the alien-influenced Sartorius, the Society of Light's legion of followers dedicate themselves to worshipping the Light of Destruction, and are intent on cleansing the Earth of its deficiencies.

A fortune-teller with dual personalities under the influence of The Light Of Destruction. Sartorius serves as the main antagonist of the second season, poised to remake the world in the image most befitting the extraterrestrial radiance within him. Sartorius plays an Arcana Force deck.
 

Lorenzo is the champion of the "Shooting Game" arcade game. His name means "silver meteor" when translated in Japanese order. Lorenzo is employed by Alexis and Chazz to duel Jaden. Although he is defeated, he comes to understand his opponent's definition of a fun duel, but is punished by Sartorius for his failure. Leaving his hair stark white, Sartorius takes complete control of him and his future. Lorenzo plays a B. E. S. deck
 

Princess Rose is a representative selected by Sartorius to duel Jaden in his place. Rose claims to have the ability to see Duel Monster spirits, but others do not believe her. Jaden, however, notices the spirit of a frog prince watching over her following their duel. Rose plays a Frog deck.
 

Bob Banter is the Game Show King who has feelings for Alexis. Saddened by the fact that Alexis never remembers his name, Bob duels Jaden in hopes of impressing her. Bob plays a Quiz deck.

X is a Pro League duelist for the Society of Light. His name is meant to be a pun in English, as "mill" (a term borrowed from Magic: The Gathering) denotes a direct disruption of a player's deck. X is a Pro League duelist associated with the Society of Light whose ranking is greater than Aster's. In the English version, X of dreamt becoming a pastry chef as a child, but instead grew up to become an attorney.  He successfully reduced the cards in Jaden's deck to zero, but lost when Jaden was unable to draw, due to the effect of the Neo-Spacian Glow Moss he had summoned on X's field, causing him to discard his deck. X plays a Deck Destruction deck.
 

Prince Ojin is a professional duelist and celebrity from Misgarth. His name is meant to be a pun, as "ōjin" is the Japanese word for "royal person".
Ojin dueled against Sartorius in the GX tournament. He gloated that he would defeat Sartorius with one attack, but was himself defeated before Sartorius's first turn even came. Upon his defeat, he fell under Sartorius's influence and provided him with the control switch to his mind control satellite. He returns later in the tournament to retrieve one of the switch's keys given to Jaden by Sartorius's good personality, but fails despite aid from the Dark Light. While Jaden and Sartorius face one another in their final duel, Ojin falls under Sartorius's control once again, and is successful in arming the satellite. Ojin plays a Satellite deck.

Dr. Eisenstein is a nine-time Nobel Award-winning German physicist, with an IQ of 173, specialized in duel physics. His name is a pun on the name of Albert Einstein. Eisenstein arrives at Duel Academy under Prince Ojin's request, and is sent by Sartorius to eliminate Jaden and retrieve his key to the mind control satellite, though his underestimation of the young duelist's tactics results in his failure. Bastion idolizes him for his unified theory of the world.

 
Sarina is Sartorius's younger sister. A Priestess, Sarina granted her assassins special abilities with her own powers, and erected a barrier around Domino City that prevented Duel Monster spirits from leaving the boundary while Frost and Thunder dueled Hassleberry and Syrus. After disposing of her subordinates, she challenged Aster and Jaden to a Tag Duel in KaibaLand's virtual system, but was ultimately defeated. Sarina then revealed that she wished to save her brother from the influence of an evil aura housed in a Hero card that was shown to him when they were younger. In a final act of gratitude, she helped those trapped within the virtual world to escape, but was left behind in the collapsing program, digitizing herself to act as her brother's "guardian." While no mention of it is made in the English adaptation, the Japanese version further includes a promise by Solomon Moto to speak with Seto Kaiba in hopes of restoring her consciousness. Sarina returns near the end of the second year, contributing to the mind control satellite's end. She is flown in to Duel Academy via helicopter by Kaiba's associates, and reunited with her brother. Sarina plays a Mirror deck.
The 
A group of assassins in Sarina's service. They each use Monarch monsters related to their name.
 

The "Ikazuchi" portion of his name in the Japanese version is derived from the word "ikazuchi" (雷), meaning "lightning."

The "Kouri" portion of his name in the Japanese version is derived from the word "kōri" (氷), meaning "ice".

The "Honou" portion of his name in the Japanese version is derived from the word "honō" (火), meaning "fire."

The "Iwa" portion of his name in the Japanese version is derived from the word "iwa" (岩), meaning "rock".

Martin Empire

Yubel is a duel spirit that is owned by Jaden and the main antagonist of season 3. When Jaden was a child, Yubel was protective of him and caused anyone to come near him to fall into a coma. Jaden had sent Yubel into a capsule which was fired into space in hopes of her coming in contact with the Darkness of Justice in order to cure her of her protectiveness. However, the capsule that Yubel was in became affected by the Light of Destruction, driving her insane and causing her to begin to believe that love and suffering are the same thing. When she returned to Earth, Yubel was heavily damaged to the point where her hand was the only thing left of her. Yubel met Professor Viper and made a deal with him that if he could gather enough energy to revive her and make Jaden pay she'd revive dead son. Once Viper failed, Yubel presumably killed Viper though his status is unclear (In the Japan version, she rewrites his memories to send him to walk to his death). Yubel would possess Marcel's body and afterwards Jesse Anderson's body all to show Jaden how much she loves him through the pain her actions bring to him. She carries a pathological hating for Jaden's friends and loved ones, out of the belief that they stole him from her. In the end, during the duel with Jaden, he would merge his soul with Yubel's, bringing her peace. Yubel plays a fiend/plant deck that featured her own card.

Marcel Bonaparte is a Ra-Yellow student and the son of Vice Chancellor Bonaparte. Marcel was always depressed at the sight of his parents fighting all the time and he became even more depressed when his father left home, leaving him with his mother. Marcel was possessed by Yubel after she sensed how he suffered. However, he would be freed from her control after Yubel gained enough energy to sustain her body and did not need him anymore. Under Yubel's control, Marcel played an Exodia deck and, after gaining the Three Sacred Beast cards, switched to a new deck that focuses on them. In the English dub, Marcel has a French accent. When he is possessed by Yubel he loses this accent leading to a running gag where whenever someone talks to him they ask what happened to his accent.

Professor Thelonious Viper was a major antagonist. During a mission with his comrades, he found a baby boy all by its lonesome. When Viper went after the baby his comrades went in another direction and got blown up by a bomb. Believing the baby saved his life, Viper vowed to raise him as if he were his own. Naming the boy Pierce, Viper adopted and raised him. One day, Viper gave Pierce a deck of Duel Monster cards as a present but they were blown away by the wind. When Pierce went after them, he was hit by an on-coming truck and was killed. In another mission, Viper encountered Yubel, who offered to resurrect Pierce if Viper were to gather enough energy to revive it and make Jaden pay, to which Viper agreed to do. Viper entered Duel Academy a couple of years later and gave Bio-Bands to the students of the academy in hopes that the energy they produced from their duels would be enough to revive Yubel. Viper would eventually duel Jaden Yuki and lose to him but the energy from that duel did revive Yubel. However, Yubel found another way to keep her deal to Viper. She cast Viper in an illusion and made him believe his son never died. Viper walked off the arena that he and Jaden were dueling on and fell to his death (In the dub, his status is most likely dead but unclear). Professor Viper played a snake-themed deck.

Minor characters

Duel Monsters

Several Duel Monster spirits not directly linked to the main cast appear throughout the series.

The Alien of Light's duel with Jaden, which was arranged by Neo-Spacian Aqua Dolphin, serves as a test of the boy's abilities to wield the powers of darkness. It plays a Different Dimension deck.

A Duel Spirit towards whom Syrus Truesdale harbors feelings for, Dark Magician Girl surfaces during a school-wide festival to duel with Jaden. She plays a Spellcaster deck.

A cursed card that grants duelists incredible draw power in exchange for selling their soul. It was locked away at North Academy until Lucien stole it.

A dictatorship of legendary monsters hailing from the world of the humans trapped in the third alternate dimension that Jaden and his companions visit. Its army is composed of numerous advisers and foot soldiers, and is headed by Dark World's king Brron. None prevailed against Jaden.

The captain of the Steel Knight army which protects the humans trapped in the third alternate dimension that Jaden and his companions visit, including the daughter and son of one of his battalion, Lars. He leads the fight against the Dark World monsters, and sacrifices himself to give Jaden a fighting chance against its knight, Zure.

The leader of the Gravekeepers who demands that all intruders seen as tomb robbers be buried alive. He duels Jaden in a Shadow Game. He plays a Gravekeeper deck.

The Gravekeeper's Assailant who rescues him Jaden from harm while he searching for his friends in another world. Jaden develops a little crush on her though he is ultimately captured and forced to duel the Chief in a Shadow Game.
Supreme King advisors
Consisting of Skilled White Magician, Skilled Dark Magician, Skull Knight, Chaos Sorcerer, and Guardian Baou, they serve as henchmen to Jaden while under the guise of the Supreme King. All but Baou are destroyed, prior to Jaden's defeat, and Baou is dispatched by Jaden himself afterwards.

 
A winged warrior who guards the power generator in the second alternate dimension that Jaden and his companions visit. He plays a Winged-Beast deck.

An evil Duel Spirit who seeks to become a real person, Jinzo takes the souls of those who summon him. This may be the case because Jinzo is a Dark-attribute monster. A group of three students including  unwittingly call him forth, but was defeated by Jaden in a Shadow Game and forced to give up his ambition. He plays a Psycho deck.

A monster modeled after Seto Kaiba, Kaibaman duels and defeats Jaden, after he and his friends happen upon the Duel Monsters world. He intended to quell Jaden's worries regarding Shadow Games, and thus sarcastically threw around the possibility that he himself may have been initiating such a battle with Jaden. He plays Seto Kaiba's deck.

An angel who belongs to Yusuke Fujiwara, before being put away in a box when Yusuke goes to the darkness. At the beginning of Season 4, he disguises himself as Yusuke and uses his powers to manipulate the memories of the others into thinking he's been there all along. However, Jaden's powers show his true form, and Honest later resides inside Jaden's body until he and Jesse face Yusuke, in which Honest returns to Fujiwara's side following his defeat.

Season 1 
 

A man who travels the sea in a submarine, The Admiral docks at Duel Academy because of his interest in Jaden Yuki, who first thought he was one of the Shadow Riders, due to his interest in the Three Sacred Beasts. He intended to recruit Jaden for the new Duel Academy he was building under the sea. The Admiral plays a Sea deck.

An Obelisk Blue pupil and the former top student of Duel Academy, Belowski has the power to communicate with Duel Sprits. Those in his presence gradually fall asleep without proper precautions, and he is therefore confined to his own personal dorm, a secluded paradise within the depths of the school. Belowski returns during the second year as one of the few Obelisk Blue students left untouched by the Society of Light, and participates in one duel of the GX tournament against Elroy Prescott, who becomes so tired from the boy's special ability that he forfeits the match. Belowski plays a Mokey Mokey deck. His character in the English version, as well as the title of his debut episode, are based on the film, The Big Lebowski.

A Ra Yellow student who aspires to be a game designer. He played the part of the duelist "The Duel Giant" with Brier giving him instructions via a radio headset during duels. The duo did this to win cards, by bullying Obelisk Blue students into unauthorized Ante Duels. This trick was successful, until Jaden convinced the two to battle him out in the open in exchange for not turning them in. Beauregard play a Goblin deck.

A Ra Yellow student who was the brains of the duelist "The Duel Giant" with Beauregard. The duo did this to win cards, by bullying Obelisk Blue students into unauthorized Ante Duels. This trick was successful, until Jaden convinced the two to battle him out in the open in exchange for not turning them in. Brier play a Goblin deck.

An Obelisk Blue student who left to live in the wild to perfect a strange drawing technique. Damon returns during the second year as one of the few Obelisk Blue students left untouched by the Society of Light, and participates in one duel of the GX tournament against Mathmatica. In the English version, Damon replaces the word "I" with "me" when referring to himself. Damon plays a Draw deck. His character is based on Tarzan.

A Ra Yellow student who tends to mimic other people's decks, Dimitri dedicates himself to impersonating the owner of the deck in almost every detail. After losing a duel against Syrus with a copy of Dr. Crowler's deck, he decided to steal Yugi Muto's deck from its display case during an exhibition at Duel Academy. Despite its possession, Dimitri is defeated by Jaden as he lacked the same heart that Yugi put into creating his deck. In the English version, Dimitri refers to his Spell Cards as "Magic Cards," as this was the term used in the original Yu-Gi-Oh! series before the revised printing format of the TCG took effect. He also manages to convince himself that he is actually Yugi, an aspect that was not in the original version.

Foster, the chancellor of North Academy, aids Chazz Princeton in gaining access to the school to duel its top duelist Czar. He later places a bet on the outcome of the Duel between Chazz and Jaden with Sheppard. The prize, however, turns out to be nothing more than a kiss from Dorothy.

The top duelist of North Academy until Chazz defeats him. Czar plays a Zoa deck.

A reporter who snuck into Duel Academy in the guise of a Slifer Red student, Gerard intended on jumpstarting his career by ruining the school's reputation. He was originally a duelist who gave up the game after an encounter with Seto Kaiba, but after seeing Jaden and Bastion Misawa battle one another, his dueling spirit was rekindled and he decided to help find the missing students of the Academy.

One of Chazz's older brothers who are top in the political and financial worlds. He and Slade attempt to dictate Chazz into becoming top in the dueling world to empower the Princeton name.

The head of Duel Academy's tennis team, Harrington wishes to marry Alexis. He duels with Jaden to gain the right to take her as his fiancée. Harrington plays a Tennis deck.

Chumley's father and a famous duelist, Mr. Huffington visits Duel Academy to have his son pulled from his studies to help out with his business. He has drinking problems, but instead in the English version, he owns a hot sauce company. Mr. Huffington plays a Hot Sauce deck.

A childhood classmate of Alexis', Pierre is a world famous gambler who has mastered games from blackjack to poker. Disgraced as a child when Alexis became the first person to defeat him, he stole a scarf from her and returned to Duel Academy to defeat her and reclaim his honor. Upon losing, he admitted he had fallen in love with Alexis, but is rejected. In the English version, Pierre has a French accent. Pierre plays a Gamble deck.

One of Chazz's older brothers who are top in the political and financial worlds. He and Jagger attempt to dictate Chazz into becoming top in the dueling world to empower the Princeton name. Slade plays a Rare Dragon deck.

An experimental chimpanzee that has the ability to duel, Wheeler escaped the facility where he was being held, but was set free after dueling with Jaden to live in the wild with the rest of his kind. Wheeler returns during the second year to remind Jaden of his time spent at Duel Academy. His name in the English version is derived from the family name of Joey Wheeler, whom Seto Kaiba titled a "dueling monkey," during the second series Yu-Gi-Oh! anime. His name in the Japanese version is pronounced "saru," which is the Japanese word for "monkey". Wheeler plays a Monkey deck.

Season 2 

The spirit of a doll possessed by the vengeful Doll Chimera card, which was ripped in half by a duelist who saw it as useless, Alice posed as a transfer student of Slifer Red and sought out victims to plunge into darkness. She was finally quelled when Jaden destroyed Doll Chimera, thus freeing her from its influence. She has long gray hair. Alice plays a Doll deck. Her character is based on the title character of Alice's Adventures in Wonderland.

The D is Aster Phoenix's legal guardian and the reigning champion of the Pro League for ten years. He is also the culprit behind Aster's father's murder, having stolen the Ultimate Destiny Card. Because the card was corrupted by the Light of Destruction, The D developed a sadistic and uncaring split personality bent on destruction. After being defeated by Aster, he is killed in the explosion resulting from the Ultimate Destiny Card's purification. The D plays a Plasma deck. His former name in the English version is derived from the surname of Kyle Gass and the nickname of Jack Black (Jables). His name in the Japanese version stands for "Destiny of Duelists".

A collector with an IQ of 202, Doctor Collector duels with The D to claim the championship title in the Pro League. He has the ability to read the minds of other duelists, and in the past, aided the FBI in solving card-related crimes while in jail because of his vast knowledge on the subject. While the whereabouts of his physical body after the Duel is explained as being absorbed by Plasma (showing Doctor Collector's face on the left wing of Plasma during the confrontation between The D and Aster Phoenix) in the English version, the fire caused by the Ultimate Destiny Card in the Pro League stadium is linked to his death in the Japanese version, though DD believes it was in fact the shock of being defeated that proved fatal. Doctor Collector plays a Spellcaster Lock deck.
 

A card designer from Industrial Illusions who is jealous of Chumley Huffington's talents, and whose own designs are looked down upon for they are too powerful for gameplay. He manipulates the only remaining copy of The Winged Dragon of Ra stolen from the company, avoiding the god's punishment with a Spell Card of his own creation, Mound of the Bound Creator, but is defeated by Jaden and agrees to return to Industrial Illusions as a loyal employee. In the English version, Franz has a German accent. Franz plays a Ra deck.

GX Pro League duelists
Several Pro League duelists are invited by Chancellor Sheppard to participate in the GX tournament.

Ranked ninth in the Pro League, Memphis champion (in the Japanese version, he is instead a Latin duelist) Elroy duels Belowski. His name in the Japanese version is Spanish for "shadow soldier".

Gelgo duels Chazz. His character based on Golgo 13.
 

Ranked eighth in the Pro League, Maitre d' begins dueling Mindy and Jasmine 2-on-1, but Alexis Rhodes steps in to duel in their place. He plays a Wine deck.

Ranked tenth in the Pro League, Mathmatica duels Damon. He plays a Math deck.

The secretary and most trusted advisor of Prince Ojin, Linda reveals the secret behind the two keys given to Jaden and Aster by Sartorius' good personality. She also assists Tyranno in chasing after Ojin when he prepares to arm their country's mind control satellite.

A failing duelist originally from North Academy, Lucien makes a deal with the malevolent spirit of the forbidden and cursed Grim Reaper card sealed by the school, selling his soul to obtain incredible draw power. Although he claims that his goal is to be victor of the GX tournament, his true wish was to experience a trusting bond with his deck. To that end, he threw the Reaper's card away, committed to winning without its assistance. Lucien plays a One Round Win deck.

A member of Obelisk Blue infatuated with Zane Truesdale, Missy duels Syrus in hopes of pursuing her love interest in the Pro League. Missy plays an Insect deck.

A promoter that offers Zane the opportunity to participate in the Underground Duel against Mad Dog to redeem himself after his chain of failures in the Pro League. In the English version, Shroud has a Southern accent.

An underground Duelist that is the "Gatekeeper of Hell" after defeating twenty Duelists. He duels Zane in the underground dueling bar and is defeated. In the English version, Mad Dog's voice is an imitation of Mike Tyson. Mad Dog plays a Slime deck.

In the English version, Orlando is a Broadway actor who says that he starred in plays such as Deck Side Story and Duelist on the Roof. Kabukid is a professional cosplay duelist in the Japanese version. Orlando duels against Jaden in the GX tournament. Both Crowler and Bonaparte are adoring fans of Orlando. Orlando plays a Kabuki deck.

A scientist and a parody of Albert Einstein. He duels Jaden, but is defeated. He later takes on Bastion Misawa as his apprentice, and later assists the others in sending Rainbow Dragon to the other dimension and getting everyone home. Eisenstein uses a Science deck.

In the English version, he insults Chazz without end, while in the Japanese version, he idolizes him instead. Reggie plays a Warrior deck.

Season 3 

Echo is Adrian Gecko's friend. She deeply admires Adrian for putting his younger brother's needs ahead of himself despite the fact that he will always be considered lesser than the true heir to Gecko family name, and sees that he is fit to rule the world as a king, though his responsibilities to his sibling prevent him from doing so. As an adult, she became captain of the Gecko Financial Group's spy submarine. In the third alternate dimension that Jaden and his companions visit, Adrian sacrifices her to the spirit of Exodia the Forbidden One to make it his servant. Her spirit later aids Adrian in his duel against Jesse when he is possessed by Yubel, but only ends up being used by Yubel to regain its power when the psychopath feeds off the darkness in her soul. She completely disappears after Adrian's defeat, causing him to mourn for her loss. Her name is derived from the name of the nymph Echo in Greek mythology.

A Duel Academy professor and former Pro League duelist, Stein fosters a grudge towards Jaden for ruining the interest of other students in his lectures due to the boy's lazy approach to lessons. He prevents Jaden from reaching Professor Viper in the lab where the monkey Wheeler was trained but seemingly falls to his death upon being defeated. In the English version, his field of specialty is history, and he was urged by his parents to earn his degree, leading him to drop out of the professional dueling circuit, while in the Japanese version, he instead comes from a poverty-stricken family and dueled to support it. In the English version, Stein also makes numerous references to the fifth season of the original anime, which took place in ancient Egypt. Stein plays a Scab Scarknight deck. His character in the English version, as well as the title of his debut episodes, are based on the game show, Win Ben Stein's Money and its eponymous host.

A ruthless Duel Spirit hunter, Trapper is hired by Professor Viper to duel Jesse Anderson in the lab where the monkey Wheeler was trained. Himself a victim of Duel Spirit theft, he seeks to attain the yet-to-be-created Rainbow Dragon card and lures Jesse into a battle by sealing the spirit of Sapphire Pegasus in a capsule. Trapper plays a Hunting deck.

Season 4 

A mysterious new student attending Duel Academy. Jaden later discovers from Atticus that Yusuke was a student with him and Zane several years earlier, but vanished in the abandoned dormitory. Atticus later remembers that Yusuke was the original host of Nightshroud, and bestowed Nightshroud's powers and spirit to him before he vanished. The Yusuke currently at Duel Academy is later revealed to be the duel spirit Honest, Yusuke's spirit partner who has been searching for him. Honest is later destroyed by Trueman when he sacrifices himself to help Jaden, but Jaden adds him to his deck and uses him in his third rematch against Trueman. The true Yusuke later returns to Duel Academy as the leader of Trueman's invasion, now the leader of the world of Darkness and endowed with its full power. He is challenged by Atticus to a duel after defeating virtually everyone at Duel Academy and defeats him sending him to the world of Darkness. Yusuke is then challenged to a three-way duel with Jaden and Jesse. He defeats Jesse, but Jaden summons Rainbow Neos to defeat him and exorcise Nightshroud from his body. Yusuke plays a Clear deck.

Also called , is a mysterious being made up of dark energy that appears at Duel Academy to duel Jaden several times. There are more than one of him, however, so if the Trueman Jaden duels is the same one each time or not is uncertain. Trueman claims he is named as such because he speaks only the truth. Trueman eventually assaults the city of Domino and possesses or kidnaps most of its citizens as a ploy to lure Jaden away from Duel Academy, allowing him to assault the school by possessing the student Taigo Sorano. After the army of Truemen defeat all but Atticus, Atticus uses the power of Nightshroud to undo the amnesia Trueman has inflicted upon him and challenges their leader, Yusuke Fujiwara. During Jaden's duel with Yusuke, all the Trueman clones are killed by Rainbow Neos. Trueman plays a Dark deck. Trueman is similar to Agent Smith an antagonist from The Matrix films.

The successor to the dueling style of Psycho-Style, the rival school of Cyber-Style. Makoto challenges Zane Truesdale with the intent of declaring the superiority of Psycho-Style over Cyber-Style. However, when Zane's health fails, Syrus Truesdale duels Makoto in Zane's stead and defeats him. Makoto plays a Psycho deck.

Senrigan Group
The Senrigan Group is a powerful corporation that sponsors Aster Phoenix. The Group manufactured the ultimate D card Destiny End Dragoon for Aster, and when it was thought stolen his career was threatened. However, when the Group later recovers the card, they agree to continue funding Aster.

A television promoter who attempts to set up a promotional duel between Aster Phoenix and Jaden Yuki. Mike later recruits Chazz Princeton to duel in Aster's place after stealing the Destiny End Dragoon card in the hopes Aster's career will fail. After telling Chazz to purposely lose to Jaden for the sake of television ratings, he sets up a similar duel between Chazz and Aster. During the card is recovered from Mike and he is arrested.

A young boy residing in Domino City. He is frustrated that he is "not strong enough" at dueling, and is consoled by Trueman, who appears due to "the darkness in Tsutomu's heart". He joins Trueman by his own accord in order to "become stronger", but later appears to be possessed by Trueman. He is used by Trueman to gain control over the rest of the residents of Domino City. It is also Trueman in disguise as him who corners Axel Brodie while the latter was investigating the city.

A top-ranked Obelisk Blue student in his second year who duels Jaden in the graduation tournament. After losing, Sorano is possessed by Trueman and used to duel the rest of the Academy. Sorano plays a Horus deck.

Manga 

Koyo, once a three-time Duel Monsters champion, was tricked by a dark entity to become an elite duelist, although his memory of the incident was erased, and the entity declared that his health would fail each time he drew a card. Koyo decided to duel a young Jaden while in a Tokyo hospital despite his failing health. During the duel, Koyo barely manages to finish, and later falls into a coma. In a flashback it is revealed that Chazz received an autograph from him, and in the process, Koyo's Winged Kuriboh altered Chazz's Light and Darkness Dragon card. Koyo plays a nature-based Elemental Hero deck. Before the start of the manga, Koyo gave Jaden his deck, including the one-of-a-kind Elemental Hero Terra Firma card. Koyo's full name means "autumn colors".

the head teacher of first-year Slifer Red students at Duel Academy and Koyo's sister.

A contestant in the Duel Academy beauty pageant, Seika becomes angered when Alexis wins the pageant. After forfeiting the pageant when Jaden defeats Alexis in a duel, Seika returns during a tournament to duel Jaden herself. She is defeated, and angrily rejects Jaden's suggestion that the duel was fun. Seika plays a Serpent deck.

Rabb is a companion of Zane who follow him to Duel Academy. He is aware of the existence of duel spirits and target Jaden for his Winged Kuriboh, although David later becomes aware that Chazz Princeton also has a duel spirit. He becomes a finalist in a tournament to celebrate Zane's return to Duel Academy, and have some sort of connection to a mysterious entity who desires the energy of duel spirits to manifest itself. It is also revealed that he possess one of the Planet cards, although this has not yet been elaborated on. Rabb plays a Big Saturn deck.

MacKenzie is a companion of Zane who follows him to Duel Academy. She is of the existence of duel spirits and targets Jaden for his Winged Kuriboh. She becomes a finalist in a tournament to celebrate Zane's return to Duel Academy, and has some sort of connection to a mysterious entity who desires the energy of duel spirits to manifest itself. It is also revealed that she possesses one of the Planet cards, although this has not yet been elaborated on. MacKenzie plays an Angel deck.

Ryuga is teacher trainee assigned to duel fifty students. On the condition that he could pass them all, he would be recognized as an official professor of Duel Academy. He is rumored to take the cards of those he defeats. When he duels, he uses a special ring to emit an electromagnetic force that disables his opponent's Duel Disk, preventing their use of Spell Cards. He challenges Jaden, but the duelist defeats Ryuga with his Alternate Fusion card. Ryuga plays a Dinosaur deck.

Other characters from Yu-Gi-Oh! Duel Monsters

Notes

References

External links
  (English)

Yu-Gi-Oh! GX
GX